Kaźmierczak  is a Polish-language patronymic surname derived from  the given name Kazimierz. 

Notable people with the surname include:
 Barbara Kazmierczak, American microbiologist
 Ludwik Kaźmierczak, birth name of Ludwig Kasner, paternal grandfather of German Chancellor Angela Merkel  
 Marie Kazmierczak, All-American Girls Professional Baseball League player
 Przemysław Kaźmierczak, Polish footballer
 Steven Kazmierczak, perpetrator of the 2008 Northern Illinois University shooting
 Stanley Kazmierczak Keyes, Canadian diplomat and politician

See also

References